Moonglow is the eighth full-length album by Tobias Sammet's German metal opera project Avantasia. It was released on 15 February 2019 through Nuclear Blast. As with previous Avantasia projects, the album features extensive collaborations with returning and new guest vocalists. It features 11 tracks (12 including its bonus track) and was supported by a world tour.

Background and composition
Following the Ghostlights World Tour, Tobias Sammet felt exhausted and decided to take a break. He started to write songs for what would maybe become a solo album, but he realized the songs sounded like Avantasia and decided to write a follow-up to the 2016 album. Unlike previous releases, he did not have a deadline for Moonglow.

Sammet commented that he believes Moonglow is the most "adorned and detailed album we've ever produced", including "Celtic elements, world music elements, big choirs, atmospheric stuff, [and] amazing guest vocal performances". In another interview, he added that the record would contain "great vocal performances, great songs, epic stuff, fantastic stuff, diverse stuff... world music, power metal, pop... everything." Part of the album was written and recorded in England, a country Sammet considers to be highly inspiring for him.

The album marks Hansi Kürsch's and Candice Night's first guest performances on an Avantasia album. Sammet first wanted to have Kürsch sing in The Metal Opera, but wasn't able to do so due to scheduling conflicts. When he wrote "Moonglow", he didn't initially have Night in mind, but when he tried to think of someone to sing on the track, she seemed the ideal name.

Title and theme 
Inspiration for the album title came from Sammet's fascination for the Moon. The story follows a nocturnal creature struggling to cope with the reality of boldness and beauty and ends up resorting to the darkness of the moonglow to hide itself from the world.

Lyrics deal with themes such as adjustment and non-adjustment, expectations, convictions and feeling out of place and fall within the Victorian gothic and dark romanticism genres.

Artwork 
The album cover is influenced by Tim Burton; it was created by Swedish painter Alexander Jansson based on what Sammet told him about the character's story.

Track listing
All songs are written by Tobias Sammet, except "Maniac" by Dennis Matkosky and Michael Sembello.

Personnel
Adapted from the album's booklet, Nuclear Blast and Blabbermouth.net.

Avantasia
 Tobias Sammet – lead vocals, additional keyboard, bass guitar
 Sascha Paeth – guitar, bass guitar, mixing
 Michael Rodenberg – keyboard, piano, orchestration, mastering
 Felix Bohnke – drums

Guest vocalists
 Ronnie Atkins (Pretty Maids)
 Jørn Lande (Jorn)
 Eric Martin (Mr. Big)
 Geoff Tate (ex-Queensrÿche)
 Michael Kiske (Helloween)
 Bob Catley (Magnum)
 Candice Night (Blackmore's Night)
 Hansi Kürsch (Blind Guardian)
 Mille Petrozza (Kreator)

Additional musicians
 Nadia Birkenstock – Celtic Harp
Oliver Hartmann – additional lead guitar on track 4 & backing vocals
Herbie Langhans, Billy King, Bridget Fogle, Lerato Sebele, Alvin Le-Bass, Stokely Van Daal – backing vocals

Charts

Weekly charts

Year-end charts

References

2019 albums
Avantasia albums
Nuclear Blast albums
Concept albums